Bourne Paddock was a cricket ground at Bourne Park House, the seat of Sir Horatio Mann, at Bishopsbourne around  south-east of Canterbury in the English county of Kent. It was a venue for first-class cricket matches from 1766 to 1790.

The ground was within the grounds of Bourne Park House. Archaeological surveys have shown that it was built on an area which was settled during the Iron Age and Roman periods. A modern cricket pavilion and a large iron roller used to roll the cricket pitch remain at the site, but the ground is no longer in use.

Matches
Bourne Paddock is first mentioned in an item in the Kentish Weekly Post describing a recent match involving Mann's own Bourne Cricket Club and Dartford Cricket Club in September 1766. The result of the game is unknown. Bourne Cricket Club effectively represented Kent during the late 18th century and attracted large crowds to the ground. A total of 17 matches played on the ground were given retrospective first-class cricket status by some sources.

Its last known use was for a top-class game between East Kent and West Kent in September 1790. Mann moved away from Bourne soon afterward.

A modern cricket club, Bishopsbourne Cricket Club, played matches on a ground at Charlton Park to the south of Bourne Park. This ground is still in use.

References

City of Canterbury
Cricket grounds in Kent
English cricket venues in the 18th century
History of Kent